John Paul Stozich (1927–2004) was a member of the Ohio House of Representatives.  His district consisted of an area circled around Findlay, Ohio.  He was succeeded by Chuck Brading.     In the House, he served as chair of the Health and Retirement Committee.

He also served as mayor of Findlay, Ohio.

Stozich pleaded no contest to vehicular manslaughter after he ran a stop sign in January 2004 and killed a 35-year-old mother of four.

References

1927 births
Republican Party members of the Ohio House of Representatives
2004 deaths
20th-century American politicians
People from Mingo Junction, Ohio
Mayors of places in Ohio
People from Findlay, Ohio